Amanda Renee is an American romance novelist.

Background 
She was raised in Ridgewood, New Jersey United States and now lives in coastal South Carolina. She began writing at nine-years-old, but didn't pursue it seriously until she garnered praise for a school essay against music censorship. After she was discovered through Harlequin's So You Think You Can Write contest, she began writing for their American Romance line.

Career 
Amanda received "the call" from Harlequin on March 13, 2012 after she had submitted her manuscript to them through their So You Think You Can Write competition. Many of her books center around hippotherapy, a form of physical and occupational therapy that utilize the horse's movements to treat numerous conditions.

Each of Renee's books have charted in the Nielsen Bookscan Top 100 Adult Fiction Overall Fiction lists.

Novels

Harlequin American Romance 
 Betting on Texas was published by Harlequin Books March in 2013
 Home to the Cowboy was published by Harlequin Books in August 2013
 Blame it on the Rodeo was published by Harlequin Books in February 2014
 A Texan for Hire was published by Harlequin Books in March 2015
 Back to Texas was published by Harlequin Books in May 2015
 Mistletoe Rodeo was published by Harlequin Books in October 2015
 The Trouble with Cowgirls was published by Harlequin Books in June 2016

Harlequin Western Romance 
 A Bull Rider's Pride was published by Harlequin Books in August 2016
 Twins for Christmas was published by Harlequin Books in December 2016
 The Lawman's Rebel Bride was published by Harlequin Books in July 2017
 A Snowbound Cowboy Christmas was published by Harlequin Books in November 2017
 Wrangling Cupid's Cowboy was published by Harlequin Books in January 2018
 The Bull Rider's Baby Bombshell was published by Harlequin Books in May 2018
 Montana Redemption was published by Harlequin Books in March 2019

Mills & Boon Australia Desire 
 His Ultimate Test was published by Mills & Boon Australia in June 2014

Mills & Boon Australia Cherish 
 A Bull Rider's Pride was published in large print hardcover by Mills & Boon Australia in September 2016
 The Lawman's Rebel Bride was published in large print hardcover and paperback by Mills & Boon Australia in June 2017
 A Snowbound Cowboy Christmas was published in large print hardcover and paperback by Mills & Boon Australia in October 2017
 Wrangling Cupid's Cowboy was published in large print hardcover and paperback by Mills & Boon Australia in February 2018

Mills & Boon United Kingdom American Romance 
 Betting on Texas was published by Harlequin Books March in 2013
 Home to the Cowboy was published by Harlequin Books in August 2013
 Blame it on the Rodeo was published by Harlequin Books in February 2014
 A Texan for Hire was published by Harlequin Books in March 2015
 Back to Texas was published by Harlequin Books in May 2015
 Mistletoe Rodeo was published by Harlequin Books in October 2015

Mills & Boon United Kingdom Western Romance 
 The Trouble with Cowboys was published by Harlequin Books June 2016
 Twins for Christmas was published by Harlequin Books December 2016

Mills & Boon United Kingdom Cherish 
 A Bull RIder's Pride was published in paperback and large print hardcover by Mills & Boon United Kingdom August 2016
 The Lawman's Rebel Bride was published in large print hardcover and paperback by Mills & Boon United Kingdom in July 2017
 A Snowbound Cowboy Christmas was published in large print hardcover and paperback by Mills & Boon Australia in November 2017
 Wrangling Cupid's Cowboy was published in large print hardcover and paperback by Mills & Boon Australia in January 2018

Awards 
 Home to the Cowboy (August 2013) won the Golden Quill Best Category Series Award
 Blame it on the Rodeo (February 2014) was the runner-up in the 2014 New England Readers' Choice Awards
 Mistletoe Rodeo (October 2015) is nominated in the 2015 RT Book Reviewers' Choice Award - Series Romance

Other 
In addition to writing books, Amanda teaches creative writing through the Harlequin Online Community.

References

External links 
 www.amandarenee.com
 Harlequin American Romance
 So You Think You Can Write
 HarlequinJunkie
 Cataromance
 Night Owl Romance
 USA Today Books
 Moving the Story Forward

American romantic fiction novelists
21st-century American novelists
American women novelists
21st-century American women writers
Living people
Women romantic fiction writers
Year of birth missing (living people)
People from Ridgewood, New Jersey